Maianthemum gigas is a perennial flowering plant. It is found in Mexico and Central America, growing in forest openings and along roadsides or sometimes as an epiphyte on trees.

Description
Roots are scattered evenly along rhizome units.

Leaves
Leaves have a 4-5 mm long petiole. The leaf surface is hairless with prominent veins.

Flowering clusters
45 to 400 flowers are set on a pyramid-shaped, branched flowering stalk (panicle). The main axis of the panicle arches upward, is stiff, straight and usually 15-29 cm long. It is hairless and often ribbed with light green or purple. About 25 to 30 spreading to ascending side branches are set at 2-15 mm intervals along the main axis of the panicle. The side branches are 6-15 cm long with 1 or 2 flowers at the base and others set at intervals of 1-4 mm, (up to 10 mm) along the branch.

Flowers and fruits
Flowers are set on stalks (pedicels) that are 2-5 mm long, deeply ribbed and hairless. The flowers in the common variety are made up of 3-5 mm long spreading tepals that are usually white, but sometimes have purple spots. There is a rare variety (var. crassipes) which has cup-shaped flowers and tepals that longer than the more common variety and that are yellow or yellow-white. Stamens are inserted at the base of the tepals. Fruits are rounded to weakly 3-lobed, 10-12 mm across, green mottled with red when immature, ripening to red. Flowering and fruiting occurs throughout the year

Varieties
Two varieties are recognized: Maianthemum gigas var. crassipes (Standl. & Steyerm.) LaFrankie and Maianthemum gigas (Woodson) LaFrankie var. gigas. M. gigas var. crassipes is rare, has cup-shaped flowers and tepals that are yellow or yellow-white and 5-7 mm long by 3-3.5 mm wide. M. gigas var. gigas has flowers with white or white with lavender tepals that are spreading and 2.5-5 mm long by 1.5 - 2 mm wide.

Distribution
Both M. gigas var. crassipes and M. gigas var. gigas have been found in Chiapas and Guatemala. M. gigas var. gigas is the more widespread variety, and has also been found in Costa Rica,  Nicaragua and Panamá.

Habitat and ecology
Terrestrial or ephiphytic herbs found at a wide range of elevations from 900 m to over 3000 m. M. gigas var. crassipes is rare, but M. gigas var. gigas is widespread and has often been found growing on the ground in forest openings and along roadsides.

References

gigas
Flora of Costa Rica
Flora of Guatemala
Flora of Chiapas
Flora of Nicaragua
Flora of Panama